At Home with the Braithwaites is a British television comedy-drama series which broadcast on ITV from 20 January 2000 to 9 April 2003 for four series and a total of 26 episodes.

The following is a list of episodes.

Series overview

Episodes

Series 1 (2000)
The first series was broadcast on Thursday nights at 9:00 pm

Series 2 (2001)
The second series was broadcast on Thursday nights at 9:00 pm.

Series 3 (2002)
The third series was broadcast on Tuesday nights at 9:00 pm.

Series 4 (2003)
The fourth series was broadcast on Wednesday nights at 9:00 pm.

Ratings

References

At Home with the Braithwaites